Tower Fire Hall is a former fire station in Tower, Minnesota, United States.  It was built around 1895 as the first fire station on the Iron Range, when the wooden construction, crowded lots, and inadequate plumbing infrastructure of the early mining boomtowns made fire a particular danger.  Tower Fire Hall was listed on the National Register of Historic Places in 1980 for its local significance in the theme of social history.  It was nominated for reflecting the region's serious danger of and response to fires.

See also
 List of fire stations
 National Register of Historic Places listings in St. Louis County, Minnesota

References

1895 establishments in Minnesota
Buildings and structures in St. Louis County, Minnesota
Defunct fire stations in Minnesota
Fire stations completed in 1895
Fire stations on the National Register of Historic Places in Minnesota
National Register of Historic Places in St. Louis County, Minnesota
Queen Anne architecture in Minnesota